Giovanni Antonio Zaddei  (Brescia, January 17, 1729 - unknown) was an Italian painter of the Baroque period, mainly active in Ferrara.

Biography
Zaddei studied with Antonio Paglia, then in 1746, he moved to Bologna to work under Giuseppe Marchesi, then five years later worked under Giovanni Battista Cignaroli. In 1754 he returned to Brescia, and also painted altarpieces for Gottolengo, Portesio, Coccaglio, and Preseglie.

References

1729 births
18th-century Italian painters
Italian male painters
Painters from Brescia
Painters from Ferrara
Italian Baroque painters
Year of death unknown
18th-century Italian male artists